Annie Fischer (July 5, 1914April 10, 1995) was a Hungarian classical pianist.

Biography
Fischer was born into a Jewish family in Budapest and studied at the Franz Liszt Academy of Music with Ernő Dohnányi and Arnold Szekely. She began her career as a concert pianist in 1924 at age ten, making her debut performance with Ludwig van Beethoven's Piano Concerto No. 1. When she was 12, she appeared with the Tonhalle-Orchester Zürich, performing Mozart's Piano Concerto No. 23 and Robert Schumann's Piano Concerto. In 1933, Fischer won the International Franz Liszt Piano Competition in her native city with a performance of Franz Liszt's Piano Sonata in B minor. Throughout her career she played mainly in Europe and Australia. She was seldom heard in the United States until late in her lifetime, giving only two concerts there by that time.

She was married to the influential critic and musicologist (and later director of the Budapest Opera) Aládar Tóth and is buried with him in Budapest.

Fischer fled with her husband to Sweden in 1940, after Hungary joined the Axis powers. After the war, in 1946, she and Tóth returned to Budapest. She died there in 1995.

Fischer's playing has been praised for its "characteristic intensity" and "effortless manner of phrasing" (David Hurwitz), as well as its technical power and spiritual depth. She was greatly admired by such contemporaries as Otto Klemperer and Sviatoslav Richter; Richter wrote, "Annie Fischer is a great artist imbued with a spirit of greatness and genuine profundity." The Italian pianist Maurizio Pollini praised the "childlike simplicity, immediacy and wonder" he found in her playing. Her interpretations of Mozart, Beethoven, Brahms, Schubert and Schumann, as well as Hungarian composers like Bartók have been critically acclaimed.

Fischer made studio recordings in the 1950s with Otto Klemperer and Wolfgang Sawallisch, but felt that any interpretation created in the absence of an audience would necessarily be artificially constricting, as no interpretation was ever "finished." Her legacy today thus includes many live concert recordings that have been released on CD and DVD (including a performance of Beethoven's "Emperor" concerto (available on YouTube), and  Beethoven's third piano concerto with Antal Doráti conducting). Her greatest legacy, however, is a studio-made integral set of the complete Beethoven piano sonatas. She worked on this set for 15 years beginning in 1977. A self-critical perfectionist, she did not allow the set to be released in her lifetime but, since her death, it has been released on compact disc and widely praised.

Recordings

Annie Fischer's recordings have been released by several  major record companies, which include: BBC Records, Doremi, EMI Classics, Hungaroton, Orfeo, Palexa, Q Disc, Urania, Melodiya and ICA Classics.

Beethoven
Concerto No. 1 in C major, Op. 15 (1)
Concerto No. 3 in C minor, Op. 37 (3)
Concerto No. 5 in E flat major, Op. 73 "Emperor" (1)
Sonata No. 1 in F minor, Op. 2, No. 1 (2)
Sonata No. 2 in A major, Op. 2, No. 2 (2)
Sonata No. 3 in C major, Op. 2, No. 3 (2)
Sonata No. 4 in E flat major, Op. 7 (2)
Sonata No. 5 in C minor, Op. 10, No. 1 (2)
Sonata No. 6 in F major, Op. 10, No. 2 (2)
Sonata No. 7 in D major, Op. 10, No. 3 (3)
Sonata No. 8 in C minor, Op. 13 "Pathétique" (3)
Sonata No. 9 in E major, Op. 14, No. 1 (2)
Sonata No. 10 in G major, Op. 14, No. 2 (2)
Sonata No. 11 in B flat major, Op. 22 (2)
Sonata No. 12 in A flat major, Op. 26 "Funeral March" (1)
Sonata No. 13 in E flat major, Op. 27, No. 1 "Quasi una fantasia" (2)
Sonata No. 14 in C sharp minor, Op. 27, No. 2 "Moonlight" (4)
Sonata No. 15 in D major, Op. 28 "Pastoral" (2)
Sonata No. 16 in G major, Op. 31, No. 1 (3)
Sonata No. 17 in D minor, Op. 31, No. 2 "Tempest" (2)
Sonata No. 18 in E flat major, Op. 31, No. 3 (2)
Sonata No. 19 in G minor, Op. 49, No. 1 (2)
Sonata No. 20 in G major, Op. 49, No. 2 (2)
Sonata No. 21 in C major, Op. 53 "Waldstein" (2)
Sonata No. 22 in F major, Op. 54 (2)
Sonata No. 23 in F minor, Op. 57 "Appassionata" (2)
Sonata No. 24 in F sharp major, Op. 78 (2)
Sonata No. 25 in G major, Op. 79 (2)
Sonata No. 26 in E flat major, Op. 81a "Les Adieux" (2)
Sonata No. 27 in E minor, Op. 90 (2)
Sonata No. 28 in A major, Op. 101 (2)
Sonata No. 29 in B flat major, Op. 106 "Hammerklavier" (2)
Sonata No. 30 in E major, Op. 109 (2)
Sonata No. 31 in A flat major, Op. 110 (2)
Sonata No. 32 in C minor, Op. 111 (3)
Variations (32) in C minor on an Original Theme, WoO 80 (1)
Variations and Fugue in E major on an Original Theme 'Eroica', Op. 35

Mozart
Concerto No. 20 in D minor, K 466. (1)
Concerto No. 20 in D minor, K 466: 2nd movement, Romanze. (4)
Concerto No. 21 in C major, K 467 (3)
Concerto No. 21 in C major, K 467: 2nd movement, Andante (3)
Concerto No. 22 in E flat major, K 482 (5)
Concerto No. 22 in E flat major, K 482: 2nd movement, Andante (1)
Concerto No. 23 in A major, K 488: 2nd movement, Adagio (1)
Concerto No. 24 in C minor, K 491 (1)
Concerto No. 27 in B flat major, K. 595 (1)
Prelude and Fugue in C major, K 394 (383a) (1)
Rondo for Piano and Orchestra in D major, K 382 (1)
Sonata No. 10 in C major, K 330
Sonata No. 12 in F major, K 332 (300k) (1)
Sonata No. 14 in C minor, K 457 (1)

Schumann
Carnaval, Op. 9 (2)
Concerto in A minor, Op. 54 (2)
Kinderszenen, Op. 15 (2)
Kreisleriana, Op. 16 (2)
Fantasia in C major, Op. 17 (1)

Bartók
Concerto No. 3, Sz 119 (3)
Hungarian Peasant Songs (15) for Piano, Sz 71 (1)
Romanian Folk Dances
Allegro Barbaro

Liszt
Concert Etudes (3), S 144: No. 3 in D flat major, Un sospiro (1)
Concerto No. 1 in E flat major, S 124 (2)
Grandes Etudes (6) de Paganini, S 141: No. 6 in A minor, Quasi Presto (1)
Sonata in B minor, S 178 (1)
Hungarian Rhapsody No.14

Schubert
Impromptus (4), D 935/Op. 142: No. 1 in F minor (1)
Impromptus (4), D 935/Op. 142: No. 2 in A flat major (1)
Impromptus (4), D 935/Op. 142: No. 3 in B flat major
Impromptus (4), D 935/Op. 142: No. 4 in F minor (1)
Sonata in A minor, D 845
Sonata in A major, D 959 (1)
Sonata in B flat major, D 960 (2)

Chopin

Concerto No. 1 in E minor, B 53/Op. 11 (1)
Ballade No. 1 in G minor op. 23
Scherzo No. 3 in C sharp minor, B 125/Op. 39 (1)

Bach

Brandenburg Concerto No. 5 in D major, BWV 1050

Brahms

Sonata No. 3 in F minor, Op. 5

Dohnányi

Rhapsodies (4), Op. 11: No. 2 in F sharp minor

Haydn

Andante with Variations in F minor, H 17 No. 6

Kodály

Dances of Marosszék
Lingering Song

Mendelssohn 
 Rondo capriccioso in E major, Op. 14
 Scherzo in E minor, Op. 16 No. 2

References

External links 
 Unofficial Website: Annie Fischer Legendary Pianist (with Biography,Discography,Concertography and Rare Photos) created and managed by Yuan Huang, Dec.2014

Jewish classical pianists
Hungarian classical pianists
Hungarian women pianists
Franz Liszt Academy of Music alumni
Jews who emigrated to escape Nazism
Hungarian expatriates in Sweden
Hungarian Jews
Musicians from Budapest
Pupils of Ernő Dohnányi
1914 births
1995 deaths
20th-century classical pianists
20th-century classical musicians
20th-century composers
Women classical pianists
20th-century women composers
20th-century women pianists